Wes Freed (April 25, 1964 – September 4, 2022) was an American outsider artist.  His works appeared on album covers of Lauren Hoffman and numerous American rock bands, including Cracker and the Drive-By Truckers.

Early life 
Freed was born in the Shenandoah Valley, Virginia, on April 25, 1964.  During his high school years, he served as secretary of his school's Future Farmers of America chapter.  He intended to move to New York to become an artist.  However, he relocated to Richmond, Virginia, in 1983 to study painting and printmaking at Virginia Commonwealth University.  He ultimately remained in Richmond until his death.

Career 
Before delving into art, Freed played in Dirt Ball, an alternative country band based in Richmond.  He served as its lead singer starting in 1986.  He also played with other local groups, such as the Shiners (a spin-off from Dirt Ball), Mudd Helmet, the Mutant Drones, and the MagBats.  It was during his time with Dirt Ball and Mudd Helmet that Freed designed show posters, adopting an "outsider" style that would influence his later works.

Freed became acquainted with the Drive-By Truckers (DBT) in 1997, when they both performed at the Bubbapalooza Festival.  He first worked with the group four years later on their album Southern Rock Opera.  He ultimately designed ten album covers for the Truckers.  He later identified the cover art of The Dirty South (2004) as his personal favorite.  Freed utilized marker, watercolor, and acrylic paint, typically on wood.  He also designed posters, T-shirts, backgrounds, and miscellaneous merchandise for DBT, as well as the artwork in the 2009 documentary about the Truckers, titled The Secret To A Happy Ending.  The final cover he designed for the band was for Welcome 2 Club XIII (2022).

Apart from his work with DBT, Freed collaborated with Lauren Hoffman and Cracker.  He released in 2019 The Art of Wes Freed – Paints, Posters, Pin-ups and Possums, a coffee table book that compiled his most notable works.

Personal life 
Freed was married to Jyl Freed, until they divorced.  She consequently received some of his original album cover art as part of the settlement.

Freed died on September 4, 2022, at the age of 58, nine months after he was diagnosed with colorectal cancer.

References

Further reading

External links 
 
 
 

1964 births
2022 deaths
American folk musicians
Album-cover and concert-poster artists
Artists from Virginia
Musicians from Virginia
Outsider artists
20th-century American people
21st-century American people